Lonely the Brave are an English alternative rock band from Cambridge. They were formed in 2008. The members include Jack Bennett (vocals), Mark Trotter (lead guitar), Gavin Edgeley (drums), Andrew Bushnen (bass), and Ross Smithwick (rhythm guitar) who joined the band in 2014. The band takes inspiration from an eclectic set of sources, such as Bruce Springsteen, Pearl Jam and Deftones. One journalist remarked that this culminates into "Biffy Clyro-shaped stadium rock".

On 11 March 2018 the band announced, via a heartfelt email to fans, that David Jakes would be leaving for mental health reasons. In August 2018, he was subsequently replaced by Jack Bennett. In April 2020 the band released their first material with Bennett on Easy Life Records; the single “Bound” was premiered on BBC Radio One.

Members
Current  
 Mark Trotter (lead guitar/backing vocals)
 Gavin Edgeley (drums/backing vocals)
 Andrew Bushen (bass guitar)
 Ross Smithwick (rhythm guitar/backing vocals)
 Jack Bennett (lead vocals)

Former
 Joel Mason (rhythm guitar)
 David Jakes (lead vocals)

Discography

Studio albums

Extended plays

Music videos

References

External links

English alternative rock groups
Musical groups established in 2009
Musical groups from Cambridge
Musical quartets
2009 establishments in England